Nikita Tszyu is an Australian professional boxer. He is the son of former world champion boxer Kostya Tszyu and brother of Tim Tszyu.

Early life
Tszyu was born in Sydney, New South Wales, to Russian parents. His father Kostya is of ethnic Russian, Korean and Mongolian descent and his mother Natasha Anikina is of ethnic Russian descent.  His father, Kostya, is a former undisputed light-welterweight champion and his brother, Tim, is also a professional boxer. After winning the junior national championship on occasions, Tszyu quit boxing at the age of 16 to focus on his schooling. Following high school graduation at Newington College in 2015, he enrolled in a Bachelor of Architectural Design at the University of Technology Sydney and worked in the industry for multiple years before returning to boxing at the age of 23.

Professional boxing career
Tszyu made his professional boxing debut against Aaron Stahl in March 2022 at Nissan Arena in Brisbane and was victorious via technical knockout (TKO) in the second round. His professional debut took place almost exactly 30 years after his father's first professional fight. On 11 May 2022, he then fought Mason Smith, winning by TKO in the first round, moving to a 2 - 0 record, then nikita defeated Ben Horn to move 3-0.
Moved to 4-0 in October 2022 with a stoppage win over Darkon Dryden, up next was Tasmanian Bo Belbin, Nikita stopped Belbin with devastating display  on brother Tim's undercard.
Nikita has now moved to 5/0.

Professional boxing record

References

External links

Year of birth missing (living people)
Date of birth missing (living people)
Living people
People educated at Newington College
Australian people of Russian descent
Australian people of Korean descent
Australian people of Mongolian descent
Australian male boxers
Boxers from Sydney
Sportsmen from New South Wales
Light-middleweight boxers
Southpaw boxers
University of Technology Sydney alumni